Berthold Hartwig Arthur, Graf von Bernstorff (21 January 1842 – 12 February 1917) was a German politician, forester and landowner. He served in the Reichstag from 1893 until 1907. In 1893, he bought the Dutch island of Schiermonnikoog.

Biography
Von Bernstorff was born on 21 January 1842 in Berlin, Kingdom of Prussia. He studied at the Forest Academy in Eisenach and graduated in foresty from the University of Göttingen. He worked at the foresty department of Hannover until 1866. Between 1869 and 1883, he worked in the forest administration of Gartow.

From 1883 until 1891, von Bernstorff was a member of the District Council of Dannenberg and Bleckede. He served in the Reichstag from 1893 until 1907 for the German-Hanoverian Party.

The island of Schiermonnikoog in Friesland, Netherlands was private property. In August 1893,  sold the island to von Bernstorff. Even though it was under German ownership, the island remained part of Friesland, and the citizens remained Dutch. Von Bernstorff had planned to turn the island into a luxury holiday resort similar to Sylt, however the investments remained limited to a jetty and a little forest.

Von Bernstroff died on 12 February 1917 in Höllwangen (nowadays part of Überlingen), Baden, at the age of 75.

Aftermath 

Schiermonnikoog would remain in the family. The Netherlands made several attempts to buy the island, however the family refused to sell. In July 1945, after the liberation of the Netherlands, the island was seized by the Netherlands as enemy property. 

The von Bernstorff family would spend years in litigation to reclaim their island, but to no avail. In 1983, Germany awarded von Bernstorff DM80,000 as compensation for their losses. In 1998, Hotel Graaf Bernstorff opened on the island. The Rijsbergen estate, the residence of the owner of Schiermonnikoog from 1757 until 1945, became a Cistercian monastery in 2021.

References 

1842 births
1917 deaths
Politicians from Berlin
Members of the 9th Reichstag of the German Empire
Members of the 10th Reichstag of the German Empire
Members of the 11th Reichstag of the German Empire
German landowners
Schiermonnikoog
University of Göttingen alumni
German foresters
German-Hanoverian Party politicians
Berthold